The following is a list of Florida Gulf Coast Eagles men's basketball head coaches. There have been five head coaches of the Eagles in their 21-season history.

Florida Gulf Coast's current head coach is Pat Chambers. He was hired as the Eagles' head coach in March 2022, replacing Michael Fly, who was fired after the 2021–22 season.

References

Florida Gulf Coast

Florida Gulf Coast Eagles men's basketball coaches